The Richard Boone Show is an anthology television series. It aired on NBC during the 1963-64 season.

Synopsis
Richard Boone hosted the series and starred in about half of the episodes, garnering an Emmy nomination for himself and a Golden Globe award for the show. His repertory company of 15 actors included up-and-comers such as Guy Stockwell and Robert Blake as well as such established performers as Bethel Leslie (who was nominated for an Emmy Award for her performance in the series), Warren Stevens and Harry Morgan. They rotated parts freely; each appeared in most episodes, and each starred in at least one. The regular writers included Clifford Odets.  Producer Buck Houghton was overseen by the prolific team of Mark Goodson and Bill Todman.

Programmed against the CBS sitcom, Petticoat Junction, Boone's anthology show was unable to find or keep an audience. It was cancelled after only one season, and has not been syndicated or released on home video, except for a brief showing on the Global Television Network in Canada in the late 1980s.

The show's theme tune, "How Soon" by Henry Mancini, was released as a single in the United Kingdom by RCA Victor in August 1964 and peaked at Number 10 in the UK Singles Chart.

Repertory cast

External links 
 
 The Richard Boone Show at CVTA with episode list

1963 American television series debuts
1964 American television series endings
1960s American anthology television series
Black-and-white American television shows
NBC original programming
Television series by Fremantle (company)
Television series by Mark Goodson-Bill Todman Productions
Television series by CBS Studios